The 2015–16 Robert Morris Colonials men's basketball team represented Robert Morris University during the 2015–16 NCAA Division I men's basketball season. The Colonials, led by sixth year head coach Andrew Toole, played their home games at the Charles L. Sewall Center and were members of the Northeast Conference. They finished the season 10–22, 8–10 in NEC play to finish in eighth place. They lost in the quarterfinals of the NEC tournament to Wagner.

Roster

Schedule

|-

|-
!colspan=9 style="background:#14234B; color:white;"| Exhibition

|-
!colspan=9 style="background:#14234B; color:white;"| Non-conference regular season

|-
!colspan=9 style="background:#14234B; color:white;"| NEC regular season

|-
!colspan=9 style="background:#14234B; color:white;"| Northeast Conference tournament

References

Robert Morris Colonials men's basketball seasons
Robert Morris
Robert
Robert